Pressure is a 1976 British drama film directed by Horace Ové and starring Herbert Norville, Oscar James and Frank Singuineau. It is hailed as the UK's first Black dramatic feature-length film, and has been characterised as "a gritty and dynamic study of a generation in crisis". Ové has said: "What Pressure tried to do was to portray the experience of the Windrush generation, the kids who came with them and the kids born here."

Plot
Tony is a second-generation Black British teenager, born and raised in Britain. The rest of his family—his mother, father, and older brother—were born in Trinidad in the Caribbean. This affects the family members' viewpoints about the society they live in. Tony's mother says that they, as Black people, must work hard, mind their own business and respect white people's laws because the Whites have the power.

The film shows how the older generations are satisfied with living in a society ruled by the white English, which differs from the views of the younger generation. There is a disconnection between the way Tony feels about Britain and the way that his family feels, specifically his brother. Tony's brother is active in the Black Power movement and is constantly discussing how Black people are treated as second-class citizens and have to deal with systematic racism. He stresses the idea of a collective effort on behalf of Black people, as they encompass their culture and consciousness and they must spread this consciousness.

Tony's brother emphasises how Black people must organise politically to deal with the situation themselves, since the government is not on their side. Tony tries to assimilate into the white-dominated society that surrounds him as well as fit in with his own family and their traditions. However, even as Tony tries to assimilate and maintain his faith in a British society where he can progress, he is continuously faced with obstacles.

Tony goes dancing with a white friend and then goes back with her to her apartment. A white adult screams that if he does not leave she will call the police, and that the white girl should feel ashamed for bringing back a Black boy. When Tony attends one of his brother's meetings, he witnesses the mistreatment of Black people firsthand. Police forcefully enter the meeting with no warrant or reason and beat up and arrest the Black activists. Then, police tear apart Tony's family's home, in search of non-existent drugs.

In addition to this, throughout the film, Tony cannot find a job that matches his educational qualifications. Events such as this bring to light the forces of oppression and lead to Tony's disillusionment with a just English society. Tony also struggles with his identity as a Black child born in England to West-Indian parents. He has difficulty relating to his brother who was not born in Europe, while he also cannot relate to his white friends, who do not share his obstacles in England. Tony's brother feels that all Whites are evil. Tony comes to his own conclusions based on his experiences, declaring that since only a handful of white people hold all the power, many white people are in the same position as Black people, but just do not realise it.

Cast
 Herbert Norville as Anthony "Tony" Watson
 Oscar James as Colin
 Frank Singuineau as Lucas
 Lucita Lijertwood as Bopsie
 Sheila Scott-Wilkinson as Sister Louise
 Ed Devereaux as Police Inspector
 T-Bone Wilson as Junior
 Ramjohn Holder as Brother John
 Norman Beaton as Preacher

Release
The film was shelved for almost three years by its funders, the British Film Institute (BFI), ostensibly because it contained scenes showing police brutality.

Reception
After its release in 1975, Pressure was well received critically. 
According to Julia Toppin, 

Ové said in a December 1987 interview for Monthly Film Bulletin: "When things happen here, like Broadwater Farm or the Brixton riots, I get very annoyed with the media coverage. It is so superficial. They don't do proper research. That is why I made Pressure (1978). I was tired of reading in the papers about young Blacks hanging around on street corners, mugging old ladies. Nobody tried to find out why they were doing it."

With Pressure, Ové became the first Black British filmmaker to direct a feature film. In 2017, The Telegraph ranked Pressure as the 42nd greatest British film of all time. It also topped The Guardians list of 10 pioneering films reflecting black life in Britain over the last 40 years.

References

Further reading
 Joel Karamath, "Shooting Black Britain", Index on Censorship, 2007.
 Kevin Le Gendre, "Don't Talk Black!", The Independent, 21 August 2005.

External links
 
 
 Inge Blackman, "Black Pioneers - The early history of Black filmmaking in the UK", BFI Screenonline.
 Sara Bivigou, "British Film Appreciation: Pressure (1975)", Entertainment Blog, Huffington Post, 28 July 2011.
 Hope Cunningham, "The Politics of Food in Horace Ové's Pressure", Shades of Noir.
 "Pressure, Conflict and Creativity", Raising the Bar: 100 Years of Black British Theatre and Screen, BBC Radio 4.

1976 films
1976 drama films
British drama films
Films shot in England
Black British films
Black British mass media
Black British cinema
Films set in London
Films about immigration to Europe
Films about racism in the United Kingdom
1970s English-language films
1970s British films